Rebets is a commune in the Seine-Maritime department in the Normandy region in northern France.

Geography
The small Héronchelles river, a tributary of the Andelle, flows through the commune.

Population

Places of interest
 The church of St. Denis, dating from the sixteenth century.
 Traces of a feudal castle.

See also
Communes of the Seine-Maritime department

References

Communes of Seine-Maritime